Papilio noblei is a butterfly of the family Papilionidae. It is found in Southeast Asia, from Burma to Vietnam. Recently, this species was also sighted in Namdapha National Park, India.

The wingspan is 100–120 mm.

Taxonomy

Papilio noblei is a member of the noblei species group; closely related to the demolion species group. The members of this clade are:
 Papilio antonio Hewitson, [1875]
 Papilio noblei de Nicéville, [1889]

Subspecies 
There are two recognised subspecies:
 Papilio noblei hoa Gabriel, 1945
 Papilio noblei noblei

References

Further reading
 
 T. R. New, N. Mark Collins: Swallowtail butterflies. IUCN, 1991, 36 Seiten, 
 Hans Fruhstorfer: Verzeichnis der in Tonkin, Annam und Siam gesammelten Papilioniden und Besprechung verwandter Formen. Berliner Entomologische Zeitschrift, 47; 167-234, Berlin 1902 PDF (19 MB).
 Kasambe, Raju. (2022). Noble’s Helen Papilio noblei De Nicéville, [1889] (Lepidoptera/ Papilionidae) an addition to the butterfly fauna of India.. 24. 12-14.

External links
The Global Butterfly Information System Images of types deposited in the Natural History Museum, London - jordani de Nicéville, [1889] and ssp. hoa Gabriel,1945. Taxonomic history.
Butterflycorner Images from Naturhistorisches Museum Wien
Butterflies of Indochina

noblei
Butterflies of Indochina
Butterflies described in 1889